The 1976 Welwyn Hatfield District Council election took place on 6 May 1976 to elect members of Welwyn Hatfield District Council in England. This was on the same day as other local elections.

Summary

Election result

|}

References

Welwyn Hatfield
Welwyn Hatfield Borough Council elections
1970s in Hertfordshire